Manzar (also Romanized as Manz̧ar; also known as Kūrī Manz̧ar) is a village in Jam Rural District, in the Central District of Jam County, Bushehr Province, Iran. At the 2006 census, its population was 95, in 16 families.

References 

Populated places in Jam County